The Davisson–Germer Prize in Atomic or Surface Physics is an annual prize that has been awarded by the American Physical Society since 1965. The recipient is chosen for "outstanding work in atomic physics or surface physics". The prize is named after Clinton Davisson and Lester Germer, who first measured electron diffraction, and as of 2007 it is valued at $5,000.

Recipients 

 2023: Feng Liu (physicist)
 2022: David S. Weiss
 2021: Michael F. Crommie
 2020: Klaas Bergmann
 2019: Randall M. Feenstra
 2018: 
 2017:  and Stephen Kevan
 2016: Randall G. Hulet
 2015:  and 
 2014: Nora Berrah
 2013: Geraldine L. Richmond
 2012: Jean Dalibard
 2011: Joachim Stohr
 2010: Chris H. Greene
 2009:  and Krishnan Raghavachari
 2008: 
 2007: 
 2006: 
 2005: Ernst G. Bauer
 2004: 
 2003: Rudolf M. Tromp
 2002: Gerald Gabrielse
 2001: Donald M. Eigler
 2000: William Happer
 1999: Steven Gwon Sheng Louie
 1998: Sheldon Datz
 1997: Jerry D. Tersoff
 1996: 
 1995: Max G. Lagally
 1994: Carl Weiman [sic]
 1993: 
 1992: 
 1991: 
 1990: David Wineland
 1989: 
 1988: John L. Hall
 1987: 
 1986: Daniel Kleppner
 1985: 
 1984:  and 
 1983: E. W. Plummer
 1982: Llewellyn H. Thomas
 1981: Robert Gomer
 1980: Alexander Dalgarno
 1979:  and 
 1978: Vernon Hughes
 1977: Walter Kohn and 
 1976: Ugo Fano
 1975:  and Homer D. Hagstrum
 1974: Norman Ramsey
 1972: Erwin Wilhelm Müller
 1970: Hans Dehmelt
 1967: Horace Richard Crane
 1965: 

Source:

See also
 List of physics awards

References

Awards of the American Physical Society
Atomic physics
Surface science